The following lists events that happened during 2013 in Cuba.

Incumbents
President: Raúl Castro
Vice President: José Ramón Machado Ventura (until 24 February), Miguel Díaz-Canel (starting 24 February)
Prime Minister: Raúl Castro
President of the National Assembly: Ricardo Alarcón (until 24 February), Esteban Lazo Hernández (starting 24 February)

Events

References